Kateřina Čapková (born 1973) is a Czech historian and researcher at Institute of Contemporary History, Prague. She has taught at NYU Prague and Charles University. Her father was the Protestant theologian Petr Pokorný (1933–2020).

Works

References

Living people
21st-century Czech historians
1973 births
Charles University alumni